= Girls of Arbab (TV series) =

- دختران ارباب
- Genre: Drama, Comedy
- Created by: People Media
- Directed by: Mohammad Kazemi
- Country of origin: Afghanistan
- Original language: Dari Persian
- No. of seasons: 1
- No. of episodes: 45

Production
- Cinematography: Reza Kazemi
- Editor: Ali Kazemi
- Running time: 25–35 minutes (per episode)
- Production company: People Media

Original release
- Release: 21 September 2025 – 22 February 2026

Girls of Arbab (Dari: دختران ارباب) is an Afghan drama–comedy television series in Dari Persian, directed by Mohammad Kazemi and produced by People Media.

The series focuses on the lives of several young women and their social and family experiences.

== Plot ==
The story of Girls of Arbab centers on a group of young, independent, and bold women who live in a house belonging to a man known as “Arbab.” The narrative begins with their encounter with two motorcyclists and gradually develops into conflicts, escapes, acts of revenge, and complex family relationships.

Throughout the series, themes such as romantic relationships, family disputes, social inequality, the status of women in society, violence, and situational humor are portrayed. The show combines social drama with comedic moments and follows the style of popular internet-based productions.

== Cast ==
| Actor | Role |
|---|---|
| Mehdi Abdollahi | Bakel |
| Setayesh Alizadeh | Farzana |
| Mohammad Rezaei | Khadem |
| Elaheh Hashemi | Zarghama |
| Kobra Abdollahi | Mobaraka |
| Hanana Zamani | Wazir |
| Nilofar Khorrami | Maria |
| Mahnaz Shojaei | Mina |
| Bismillah Haidari | Zabih |
| Ehsanullah Haidari | Bonyad Ali |
| Alireza Nazari | Zaker |
| Hanif Ebrahimi | Arbab |
| Samim Ebrahimi | Sakhidad |
| Khadem Khademi | Karbalai |
| Kamela Nabi-Zada | Mahnaz |
| Zakaria Khorrami | Shopkeeper |
| Hafiz Sorush | Mechanic |
| Madar Fariba | Zabih's mother |
| Madar Aliya | Bakel's mother |
| Nilofar Soltani | Afsana |
| Sobhan Kochak | Khadem's son |
| Peyman | Shopkeeper |
| Jamila Haidari | Keshwar |

== Reception and Impact ==
Girls of Arbab received mixed reactions due to its direct treatment of social issues, prominent female characters, and bold tone. Some viewers regard it as a reflection of certain social realities, while others have criticized its narrative style and technical quality. Nevertheless, the series is considered a notable example of the growth of online audiovisual productions in Afghanistan.
